Casa Bonet  is a house located at Avinguda Verge de Canòlic, 80, Sant Julià de Lòria Parish, Andorra. It is a heritage property registered in the Cultural Heritage of Andorra. It was built in 1947–9.

References

Sant Julià de Lòria
Houses in Andorra
Houses completed in 1949
Cultural Heritage of Andorra